Arnold Short (October 3, 1932 – September 26, 2014) was an American basketball player.  A 6'3 guard, he was an All-American college player at Oklahoma City University and a second round pick in the 1954 NBA draft.

Short came to Oklahoma City from Weatherford High School in Weatherford, Oklahoma.  There he became the first basketball All-American in school history.  As a senior in 1953–54, Short averaged 27.8 points per game, finishing fourth in the NCAA scoring race.  As a collegian, Short also played baseball and tennis.

Following his college career, Short was drafted in the second round of the 1954 NBA draft by the Fort Wayne Pistons (13th overall).  However, he chose to play for the Phillips 66ers in the Amateur Athletic Union (AAU) instead.  There he was an AAU All-American in 1955 as the 66ers won the AAU title.

After retiring from basketball Short became head tennis coach and an assistant basketball coach at Oklahoma City University.  He also served as the school's athletic director.

References

External links
 College stats at the Draft Review

1932 births
2014 deaths
All-American college men's basketball players
Basketball players from Oklahoma
Guards (basketball)
Fort Wayne Pistons draft picks
Oklahoma City Stars athletic directors
Oklahoma City Stars baseball players
Oklahoma City Stars men's basketball coaches
Oklahoma City Stars men's basketball players
People from Weatherford, Oklahoma
Phillips 66ers players
American men's basketball players
Basketball coaches from Oklahoma